The Bermudian cricket team toured Canada between 28 June and 1 July 2008. The two teams played 3 One-day Internationals.

ODI series

1st ODI

2nd ODI

3rd ODI

2008 in Canadian cricket
2008 in Bermudian cricket
International cricket tours of North America
International cricket competitions in 2008
Canadian cricket tours of Bermuda